Sol Solomon is a footballer from Jersey who plays for  club Marine as a forward. He left Jersey Bulls in 2022 as their record goalscorer, having scored 60 goals in 71 games in the Combined Counties Football League.

Career
Solomon began his football career playing for St. Peter F.C. on the Channel Island of Jersey, before joining Jersey Bulls after a season.

Jersey Bulls
Whilst still a teenager, Solomon scored fifteen goals in his first twenty games for the side telling BBC Sport in September 2020: "Playing for the Bulls is great for me personally because as a squad we demand so much from each other and you know you can't drop your performance around them."

Solomon kept playing for Jersey Bulls during the 2021-22 season, even after he enrolled at University in Liverpool, and would try and fly back to Jersey for games. He then switched his academic studies to Highlands College, Jersey, telling BBC Radio Jersey "I tried to play as many games as I could, like I was doing before when I was at university, but it was a bit hard flying back every weekend." Solomon achieved a degree of viral media attention for a goal he scored goal against Sutton Common Rovers in the FA Cup in 2021, which was described as a “mid-air back-heeled volley”. Solomon finished the 2021-22 season having scored 38 goals in the campaign.

Solomon had trials with Luton Town early in 2022, however, it was not until September 2022 that he left Jersey Bulls for Marine A.F.C. who play two divisions higher in the English football pyramid. He played the final game of his spell at the Jersey Bulls on 24 September, 2022. He left the club having became Jersey Bull’s highest ever goal scorer, with a record 60 goals in 71 games in the Combined Counties Football League.

Marine
Solomon scored his first goals for Marine when he netted a brace away at Whitby Town on 20 October, 2022 in a Northern Premier League fixture.

Personal life
He is a fan of Liverpool and Rangers through family connections.

References

Living people
Jersey footballers
St. Paul's F.C. players
Jersey Bulls F.C. players
Association football forwards
Marine F.C. players
Northern Premier League players
Date of birth unknown